Robert J. Booker is a historian, author, and politician. He served in the Tennessee House of Representatives.

Booker grew up in the East Knoxville neighborhood known as the "Bottom" and went to Austin-East High School. He served three years in the U.S. Army and was impressed by the freedoms and absence of segregation he experienced while stationed in Europe. Following his return he graduated from Knoxville College on a G. I. Bill scholarship.

Bibliography
Two Hundred Years of Black Culture in Knoxville, Tennessee 1791-1991
And There was Light!; The 120 Year History of Knoxville College
The Heat of a Red Summer; An Encyclopedia: The Experiences of Black People in Knoxville, Tennessee 1844-1974;  *From the Bottom Up''

References

1962 births
Living people
Historians from Tennessee
People from Knoxville, Tennessee
Knoxville College alumni
United States Army soldiers
African-American state legislators in Tennessee
African-American historians
Members of the Tennessee House of Representatives